The South African Badminton Championships is an annual badminton tournament held in South Africa since 1937. The championships were originally also open to British players.

Previous winners

References
Title holders

National badminton championships
Badminton tournaments in South Africa
Recurring sporting events established in 1948
Badminton
1948 establishments in South Africa